The Mirador del Obispado (Bishop’s Lookout) is located at the top of the Cerro del Obispado (Bishop’s Hill) in the northern city of Monterrey, Mexico. It features the biggest bandera monumental (monumental flag) in Mexico. The hill and the lookout receive their name from the building constructed in the middle of the hill by the end of the 18th century, the Palacio del Obispado (Bishop’s Palace).

At an altitude of 775 meters above the sea level the lookout consists of a 40 meters of diameter round-shaped esplanade with the flag pole at its center. There are benches, a small parking lot (mainly for handicapped people) and 3 French gardens. The installations are also equipped with restrooms and water troughs. It was conceived as a family walking stroll so the main road is very wide and well illuminated. Cars are allowed to pass but the main parking lot is at the entrance of the Park.

The Bandera Monumental

The country's biggest monumental flag was located at the top of the Cerro del Obispado, in the same place the public scenic lookout is, and it was inaugurated on February 24, 2005 to celebrate the Mexican Flag Day. This flag is currently the second largest in the country, after the one located in Piedras Negras, Coahuila. 

Some important days are celebrated with special ceremonies such as the Flag Day, the Independence Day and the Army Day; these special ceremonies sometimes include lighting shows, fireworks, and artistic performances such as regional dances, musical festivals, and concerts.

See also
Palacio del Obispado
Famous Places in Monterrey

References

External links

Monterrey Monumental Flag space view in Google Earth
Renewal of the Bishopric Hill by the State Government of Nuevo Leon 

Mirador del Obispado
Tourist attractions in Monterrey
Landmarks in Monterrey
Scenic viewpoints
Outdoor structures in Mexico